Byttneria is a genus of flowering plants in the family Malvaceae. There are about 135 species in this pantropical genus.

Byttneria species are host plants to insects such as beetles of the genus Lonchophorellus.

Species
The Catalogue of Life lists:

 Byttneria abutiloides
 Byttneria aculeata
 Byttneria affinis
 Byttneria ambongensis
 Byttneria ancistrodonta
 Byttneria andamanensis
 Byttneria angulata
 Byttneria aristeguietae
 Byttneria asplundii
 Byttneria asterotricha
 Byttneria atrata
 Byttneria attenuatifolia
 Byttneria aurantiaca
 Byttneria australis
 Byttneria baronii
 Byttneria beccarii
 Byttneria benensis
 Byttneria bernieri
 Byttneria besalampensis
 Byttneria beyrichiana
 Byttneria biloba
 Byttneria capillata
 Byttneria caripensis
 Byttneria catalpifolia
 Byttneria celebica
 Byttneria celtoides
 Byttneria cordata
 Byttneria cordifolia
 Byttneria coriacea
 Byttneria corylifolia
 Byttneria crenulata
 Byttneria cristobaliana
 Byttneria curtisii
 Byttneria dahomensis
 Byttneria decaryana
 Byttneria dentata
 Byttneria divaricata
 Byttneria ekmanii
 Byttneria elliptica
 Byttneria ellipticifolia
 Byttneria erosa
 Byttneria fernandesii
 Byttneria filipes
 Byttneria flaccida
 Byttneria flexuosa
 Byttneria fluvialis
 Byttneria fontis
 Byttneria fruticosa
 Byttneria fulva
 Byttneria gayana
 Byttneria genistella
 Byttneria glabra
 Byttneria glazioui
 Byttneria gracilipes
 Byttneria grandifolia
 Byttneria guineensis
 Byttneria hatschbachii
 Byttneria herbacea
 Byttneria heteromorpha
 Byttneria heterophylla
 Byttneria hirsuta
 Byttneria hirta
 Byttneria humbertiana
 Byttneria idroboi
 Byttneria implacabilis
 Byttneria integrifolia
 Byttneria irwinii
 Byttneria ivorensis
 Byttneria jackiana
 Byttneria jaculifolia
 Byttneria jaramilloana
 Byttneria lancifolia
 Byttneria lasiophylla
 Byttneria latipetala
 Byttneria lobata
 Byttneria lopez-mirandae
 Byttneria loxensis
 Byttneria lucida
 Byttneria macrantha
 Byttneria macrophylla
 Byttneria maingayi
 Byttneria mastersii
 Byttneria melantha
 Byttneria melastomifolia
 Byttneria melleri
 Byttneria microphylla
 Byttneria minytricha
 Byttneria mollis
 Byttneria morifolia
 Byttneria morii
 Byttneria nitidula
 Byttneria nossibeensis
 Byttneria obcordata
 Byttneria obliqua
 Byttneria oblongata
 Byttneria oblongifolia
 Byttneria obtusata
 Byttneria oligacantha
 Byttneria oligantha
 Byttneria oranensis
 Byttneria osaensis
 Byttneria ostenii
 Byttneria ovata
 Byttneria ovatifolia
 Byttneria palustris
 Byttneria parviflora
 Byttneria pedersenii
 Byttneria perrieri
 Byttneria pescapraeifolia
 Byttneria petiolata
 Byttneria pilosa
 Byttneria piresii
 Byttneria ramosissima
 Byttneria reinwardtii
 Byttneria rhamnifolia
 Byttneria rojasii
 Byttneria rubriflora
 Byttneria sagasteguii
 Byttneria sagittifolia
 Byttneria sambiranensis
 Byttneria scabra
 Byttneria scabrida
 Byttneria scalpellata
 Byttneria schumannii
 Byttneria schunkei
 Byttneria sparrei
 Byttneria stenophylla
 Byttneria subsessilis
 Byttneria tahitensis
 Byttneria tortilis
 Byttneria triadenia
 Byttneria tucumanensis
 Byttneria uaupensis
 Byttneria urosepala
 Byttneria urticifolia
 Byttneria vargasii
 Byttneria weberbaueri
 Byttneria wingfieldii
 Byttneria vitifolia
 Byttneria voulily

References

External links 

 
Malvaceae genera
Taxonomy articles created by Polbot